"Don't Let It Go To Your Head" is the title of a top twenty dance single by Chantay Savage. The song is one of Savage's biggest dance hits to date peaking at number fourteen on the Billboard Dance singles chart.

Tracklisting
Don't Let It Go To Your Head / Give It To Ya
1.) Don't Let It Go To Your Head (Silk In The House 7") [4:25]
2.) Don't Let It Go To Your Head (Silk In The House 12") [7:25]
3.) Don't Let It Go To Your Head (Album Version) [4:09]
4.) Give It To Ya (Radio Edit) [3:55]
5.) Give It To Ya (In Da Soul Mix) [4:21]

Chart positions

References

1994 singles
1994 songs
Chantay Savage songs
Songs written by Jamie Principle
Songs written by Steve "Silk" Hurley
Songs written by Chantay Savage
Songs written by M-Doc
RCA Records singles